Hoseynabad (also Romanized as Ḩoseynābād; also known as Ferdowsī) is a village in Zavarom Rural District, in the Central District of Shirvan County, North Khorasan Province, Iran. As of the 2006 census, its population was 2,572, in 601 families.

References 

Populated places in Shirvan County